Vatica micrantha is a tree in the family Dipterocarpaceae, native to Borneo. The specific epithet means "small flowers".

Description
The inflorescences bear cream-coloured flowers.

Distribution and habitat
Vatica micrantha is endemic to Borneo. Its habitat is in dipterocarp forest.

References

micrantha
Endemic flora of Borneo
Plants described in 1942